Arthur Michael Lee DSC QC (22 August 1913 – 14 January 1983) was an English barrister and judge who had a brief career as a first-class cricketer. He was known as Michael Lee in his legal life.

Lee was a right-handed batsman who bowled slow left-arm orthodox spin. He made his first-class debut for Hampshire in 1933 against Somerset. This was his only appearance for Hampshire.

In the 1934 season Lee made his debut for Oxford University against Free Foresters. He played for the university in two further first-class matches, one against a Minor Counties side in 1934 and a final match against Yorkshire in 1935.

Lee was educated at Winchester College and Brasenose College, Oxford. After the war he became a lawyer, rising to become a judge in Hampshire. According to an obituary in The Times contributed by Lord Denning he was offered a position as a High Court judge, but turned it down. He died in hospital at Midhurst, Sussex on 14 January 1983.

Family
Lee's father, Edward Lee, represented Hampshire, Oxford University and the Marylebone Cricket Club in first-class cricket.

References

External links
Arthur Lee at Cricinfo
Arthur Lee at CricketArchive

People from Liphook
English cricketers
Hampshire cricketers
Oxford University cricketers
20th-century English judges
1913 births
1983 deaths
Recipients of the Distinguished Service Cross (United Kingdom)
Royal Naval Volunteer Reserve personnel of World War II
People educated at Winchester College
Alumni of Brasenose College, Oxford